Charles Collins Van Zandt (August 10, 1830 – June 4, 1894) was the 34th Governor of Rhode Island.

Early life
He was born in Newport, Rhode Island. He graduated from Trinity College in Hartford, Connecticut, class of 1851. He then studied law and was admitted to the bar in 1853. In 1863 he married Arazelia, daughter of the judge and poet Albert Gorton Greene.

Political career
In 1855, Van Zandt was elected City Solicitor of Newport and was chosen clerk of the Rhode Island House of Representatives. In 1857, he was himself elected to the House. The following year, he became Speaker of the House. He was a State Senator from 1869 to 1870. He was a delegate to Republican National Convention from Rhode Island in 1868, Lieutenant Governor of Rhode Island from 1873 to 1875 serving under Governor Henry Howard, and Governor of Rhode Island from 1877 to 1880.

One of his foremost concerns as a governor was to expand the state's educational system, especially for the literacy needs of the state's large, urban immigrant population.

He lived in an elegant Greek Revival style house on Pelham Street in Newport.

He died in 1894 and was interred at Island Cemetery, Newport, Rhode Island.

References

External links

 
Charles Collins Van Zandt entry at the National Governors Association
Rhode Island governors
Charles Collins Van Zandt entry at The Political Graveyard

1830 births
1894 deaths
American people of Dutch descent
Republican Party governors of Rhode Island
Lieutenant Governors of Rhode Island
Politicians from Newport, Rhode Island
Rhode Island lawyers
Republican Party members of the Rhode Island House of Representatives
Republican Party Rhode Island state senators
Speakers of the Rhode Island House of Representatives
Trinity College (Connecticut) alumni
Burials in Rhode Island
19th-century American politicians
19th-century American lawyers